Wait for Me is a 1943 Soviet war drama film directed by Boris Ivanov and Aleksandr Stolper and starring Boris Blinov, Valentina Serova and Lev Sverdlin.

The film's art direction was by Artur Berger and Vladimir Kamsky.

Synopsis
Three friends, Misha Weinstein (a journalist) and Nikolai Yermolov and Andrei Panov (both pilots) promise each other to meet after the war.

During a reconnaissance mission, the plane carrying Yermolov and Panov gets shot down by the Nazis, and the two take refuge in an abandoned hut where they decide to defend themselves to the very last breath. Meanwhile, Weinstein is ordered to deliver intelligence to the front line. Panov dies, and Yermolov makes his way to the partisans and becomes a commander of one of the units. At this time, Yermolov's friends believe he has died as well. Only his wife Lisa maintains hope.

Weinstein arrives behind enemy lines to interview a successful guerrilla commander and unexpectedly discovers it is his old friend Yermolov. Weinstein tries to return to friendly territory with the news of Yermolov's survival but his plane is shot down and the correspondent dies. The letter does not reach its destination.

When Yermolov returns home he meets his wife, who in spite of everything has waited for him all this time.

Cast
 Boris Blinov as Nikolai Yermolov
 Valentina Serova as Lisa 
 Lev Sverdlin as Misha Weinstein
 Mikhail Nazvanov as Andrei Panov
 Nina Zorskaya 
 Yelena Tyapkina as Mariya  
 Andrei Apsolon as Gunner  
 Lyudmila Glazova
 Pavel Geraga as Fedya  
 Andrey Martynov as Partisan
 Ekaterina Sipavina as Pasha

References

Bibliography 
 Rollberg, Peter. Historical Dictionary of Russian and Soviet Cinema. Scarecrow Press, 2008.

External links 
 

1943 films
Soviet war drama films
1940s war drama films
1940s Russian-language films
Films directed by Aleksandr Stolper
1943 drama films
Films directed by Boris Ivanov